Lateral mass may refer to:
 Labyrinth of ethmoid
 Lateral mass of atlas